Waltham Forest College Waltham Forest College is a stand-alone Further Education College in North East London with circa 2000, 16-19 year old students on full time study programs and 5000 adult students mainly studying part time, in addition to around 920 apprentices. The College has been voted as the top performing London college for student satisfaction for two consecutive years and is rated as good by Ofsted. Waltham Forest College offers a full range of vocational and technical qualifications from pre entry to level 3. It is accredited as a Mayor’s Construction Academy.  Waltham Forest College has a growing reputation and specialism for Construction and Renewable Technologies as well as Health & Care, Digital and Creative.

History
Waltham Forest College has been creating futures for over 80 years. Since its formation in 1938 as the South-West Essex Technical College and School of Art, the College and its staff and students have seen many changes and have evolved and adapted to continually offer a valuable service to the region.

During the Second World War it was used as a naval base. Military and service personnel were taught and trained here, including Auxiliary Territorial Service members from 1942. Grosvenor House, the old building of Walthamstow Technical College, burnt down in 1945. During the 1950s additions to the building were added, while the secondary school part relocated to Billet Road becoming McEntee County Technical School. South West Essex Technical College and School of Art was renamed to Waltham Forest Technical College and School of Art in 1966 after it became part of the new London Borough of Waltham Forest in the county of Greater London.

Curriculum
Waltham Forest College offers a full range of vocational and technical qualifications from pre entry to level 3. It is accredited as a Mayor’s Construction Academy and the College has a growing reputation and specialism for Construction and Renewable Technologies as well as Health & Care, Digital and Creative.

References

External links
 
 Waltham Forest College

Education in the London Borough of Waltham Forest
Further education colleges in London